Crutchfield Crossroads is an unincorporated community in northwestern Chatham County, North Carolina, United States, north of the town of Siler City. Crutchfield Crossroads is commonly defined as the area in and around the rural intersection of Silk Hope-Liberty Road. and Siler City- Snow Camp Road. At the intersection of the two roads, there are some stores, but other than that the entire community is agricultural. Children living in this area attend schools in Silk Hope and Siler City.

Some of North Carolina's oldest farms are located near this intersection. The Whitehead-Fogleman Farm was listed on the National Register of Historic Places in 1985.

References

Unincorporated communities in Chatham County, North Carolina
Unincorporated communities in North Carolina